Krasnoflotsky is a rural locality (a settlement) in Svetloyarsky District, Volgograd Oblast, Russia. The population was 225 as of 2010. There are 3 streets.

Geography 
Krasnoflotsky is located 36 km south of Svetly Yar (the district's administrative centre) by road. Trudolyubiye is the nearest rural locality.

References 

Rural localities in Svetloyarsky District